Lincoln County is a county located in the U.S. state of Nebraska. As of the 2020 census, the population was 34,676. Its county seat is North Platte. Despite the county's name, the state capital city of Lincoln is not in or near Lincoln County. The city of Lincoln is, instead, located more than 200 miles further to the east in Lancaster County.

Lincoln County is part of the North Platte, Nebraska Micropolitan Statistical Area.

In the Nebraska license plate system, Lincoln County is represented by the prefix 15 (it had the fifteenth-largest number of vehicles registered for a state county when the license plate system was established in 1922).

Geography
The terrain of Lincoln County consists of low rolling hills cut by gullies, sloping to the east-southeast. The land is generally given to agriculture, with considerable center pivot irrigation employed. The North Platte River flows eastward through the upper center of the county. Likewise, the South Platte River flows eastward through the lower center of the county to its junction with North Platte in eastern Lincoln County, to form the Platte River which flows ESE out of the county. It is the third-largest county in Nebraska by area.

Most of Nebraska's 93 counties (the eastern 2/3, including Lincoln County) observe Central Time; the western counties observe Mountain Time. Lincoln County is the westernmost of the Nebraska counties to observe Central Time.

Major highways

  Interstate 80
  U.S. Highway 30
  U.S. Highway 83
  Nebraska Highway 23
  Nebraska Highway 25
  Nebraska Highway 97

Adjacent counties

 McPherson County – northwest
 Logan County – northeast
 Custer County – east
 Dawson County – east
 Frontier County – southeast
 Hayes County – southwest
 Perkins County – west (boundary of Mountain Time)
 Keith County – west (boundary of Mountain Time)

Protected areas

 Birdwood Lake State Wildlife Management Area
 East Hershey State Wildlife Management Area
 East Sutherland State Wildlife Management Area
 Fort McPherson National Cemetery
 Jeffrey Canyon State Wildlife Management Area
 Maloney Reservoir State Recreation Area
 Muskrat Run State Wildlife Management Area
 Platte State Wildlife Management Area
 Sutherland Reservoir State Recreation Area

Demographics

As of the 2000 United States Census there were 34,632 people, 14,076 households, and 9,444 families in the county. The population density was 14 people per square mile (5/km2). There are 15,438 housing units in Lincoln. (6/sq mi). The racial makeup of the county was 94.70% White, 0.54% Black or African American, 0.51% Native American, 0.37% Asian, 0.02% Pacific Islander, 2.65% from other races, and 1.21% from two or more races. 5.43% of the population were Hispanic or Latino of any race.

There were 14,076 households, out of which 32.00% had children under the age of 18 living with them, 55.90% were married couples living together, 8.00% had a female householder with no husband present, and 32.90% were non-families. 28.30% of all households were made up of individuals, and 11.60% had someone living alone who was 65 years of age or older. The average household size was 2.41 and the average family size was 2.97.

The county population contained 26.20% under the age of 18, 8.30% from 18 to 24, 26.60% from 25 to 44, 23.80% from 45 to 64, and 15.10% who were 65 years of age or older. The median age was 38 years. For every 100 females, there were 96.50 males. For every 100 females age 18 and over, there were 93.40 males.

The median income for a household in the county was $36,568, and the median income for a family was $45,185. Males had a median income of $36,244 versus $20,252 for females. The per capita income for the county was $18,696. About 7.20% of families and 9.70% of the population were below the poverty line, including 12.10% of those under age 18 and 9.30% of those age 65 or over.

Communities

City 

 North Platte  (county seat)

Villages 

 Brady
 Hershey
 Maxwell
 Sutherland
 Wallace
 Wellfleet

Unincorporated communities 

 Dickens
 Somerset

Politics
Lincoln County voters generally vote Republican. In only three national elections since 1916 has the county selected the Democratic Party candidate, most recently in 1964 in the midst of Lyndon B. Johnson's national landslide victory.

See also

 Lincoln County Sheriff's Office (Nebraska)
 National Register of Historic Places listings in Lincoln County, Nebraska

References

 
North Platte Micropolitan Statistical Area
1866 establishments in Nebraska Territory
Populated places established in 1866